The Solar System Family Portrait is an image of many of the Solar System's planets and moons acquired by MESSENGER during November 2010 from approximately the orbit of Mercury. The mosaic is intended to be complementary to the Voyager 1s Family Portrait acquired from the outer edge of the Solar System on February 14, 1990.

The portrait was constructed using 34 individual frames acquired using the Mercury Dual Imaging System, targeting areas surrounding each planet.  The first series of images was acquired on November 3, 2010, and the second on November 16.

Six planets are visible in the mosaic. From left to right: Venus, Earth, Jupiter, Mars, Mercury, and Saturn. Uranus and Neptune were too small to resolve at this distance (3.0-billion and 4.4-billion kilometers respectively). Careful effort was taken to avoid facing the camera toward the Solar System's central star, the Sun, due to the intense heat at close distance.

Several moons are visible in the photo, including the Earth's Moon, and all four Galilean moons: Callisto, Ganymede, Europa, and Io. Additionally, part of the Milky Way is visible between Neptune and Mars.

Because MESSENGER does not follow the same orbital plane as the Earth, the cameras on the spacecraft had to point up and down from the ecliptic to capture all of the planets. This resulted in a curved mosaic.

Although somewhat closer to Earth, a similar so-called family portrait of the Earth, Venus and Mars was taken by the Solar Orbiter spacecraft on 18 November 2020.

See also 
 Family Portrait (Voyager)

References

External links
 NASA MESSENGER feature

Astronomy image articles
Bodies of the Solar System
2010 in science
Photographs of Earth from outer space
2010 works
2010s photographs
November 2010 events

ja:太陽系家族写真#メッセンジャーによる撮影